{{Taxobox
| domain = Bacteria
| phylum = Bacillota
| classis = Clostridia
| ordo = Clostridiales
| familia = Clostridiaceae
| genus = Hungatella
| genus_authority = Kaur et al. 2014
| type_species = 
| subdivision_ranks = Species
| subdivision =
 H. effluvii
 H. hathewayi
 H. hominis
 H. xylanolytica| synonyms = 
}}Hungatella'' is a bacterial genus from the family of Clostridiaceae.

References

Clostridiaceae
Bacteria genera
Taxa described in 2014